Pasquale Domenico Rocco (born 11 October 1970 in Paderno Dugnano) is an Italian former professional footballer who played as a midfielder.

He represented Italy at the 1992 Summer Olympics.

Honours
Inter
 Serie A champion: 1988–89.

References

1970 births
Living people
Association football midfielders
Italian footballers
Serie A players
Serie B players
Footballers at the 1992 Summer Olympics
Olympic footballers of Italy
Inter Milan players
Cagliari Calcio players
Venezia F.C. players
Pisa S.C. players
A.C. Perugia Calcio players
Torino F.C. players
U.S. Cremonese players
Treviso F.B.C. 1993 players
U.S. Pistoiese 1921 players
A.S.D. Sangiovannese 1927 players